In jazz, a constant structure is a chord progression consisting of three or more chords of the same type or quality. Popularized by pianists Bill Evans and Herbie Hancock, the combination of functional and nonfunctional chords provides cohesiveness while producing a free and shifting tonal center.

For example, the progression Fmaj7–Amaj7–Dmaj7–Gmaj7–C13sus4 contains four major seventh chords (and one thirteenth chord), none of which are diatonic to the key of F major except the first.

In contrast, the vi–ii–V–I or circle progression from classical theory contains four chords of two or three different qualities: major, minor, and possibly a dominant seventh chord; all of which, however, are diatonic to the key. Thus diversity is achieved within a stable and fixed tonal center.

See also
Parallel harmony
Side-slipping

References

Jazz techniques
Music theory
Jazz terminology